Hieromartyr Clement, Bishop of Ancyra or simply Clement of Ancyra (c. 258–312) (born in Ancyra present-day Turkey) was a bishop who served during the rule of Roman emperor Diocletian. He was arrested by Roman authorities and tried by Diocletian. Emperor Diocletian attempted to convert Clement to Paganism but Clement refused and withstood tremendous torture. Clement was eventually beheaded by a Roman soldier whilst he was celebrating the Divine Liturgy in the year 312. He is venerated on 23 January according to the Gregorian calendar and on 5 February according to the civil or Gregorian calendar equivalent of 23 January in the Julian calendar by Orthodox Christians keeping this calendar, which includes all of them in some countries and traditionalist Orthodox Christians including Genuine or Authentic Orthodox Christians, True Orthodox Christians and Catacomb Orthodox Christians everywhere, together with his disciple Agathangelus of Rome.

Clement's relics are in the saint's altar in the basilica of Our Lady of Trapani in Trapani.

The Saint Clement Church is the only structure survived from the Byzantine era in Ankara.

References

External links
Saint of the Day, January 23: Agathangelus & Clement  at SaintPatrickDC.org
Iconograms article on Clement.
Patron saint index for 23 January.
OCA article for 23 January saints.

258 births
312 deaths
Bishops of Ancyra
4th-century bishops in Roman Anatolia
Saints from Roman Anatolia
Deaths by decapitation
4th-century Christian martyrs
3rd-century Romans